Swan Pond, also known as "Folkland" and the Dr. Edward O. Williams House, is a historic home located near Martinsburg, Berkeley County, West Virginia, United States. It was built after 1810, and has a -story, five bay wide, brick main section with a brick wing. The house is in a transitional Georgian / Federal-style. Also on the property is a 19th-century log outbuilding. As of January 11, 2023 the historic home and surrounding acreage returned to the ownership of the Folk family when former West Virginia State Delegate Michael Folk and his wife, Stella, purchased the 5 bedroom 4 bath home on the remaining 60+- acres.

It was listed on the National Register of Historic Places in 1977.  It is located in the Swan Pond Manor Historic District.

References

Houses on the National Register of Historic Places in West Virginia
Georgian architecture in West Virginia
Federal architecture in West Virginia
Houses completed in 1810
Houses in Berkeley County, West Virginia
National Register of Historic Places in Martinsburg, West Virginia
Individually listed contributing properties to historic districts on the National Register in West Virginia